Michaël Benayoun (born 1973), known professionally as Michaël Youn, is a French actor, singer, comedian and television personality.

Life and career 
Youn was born Michaël Benayoun in Suresnes, France, to a family of Hungarian, Italian, Moroccan-Jewish, and Algerian-Jewish descent.

After his education as an announcer and theater actor, Youn joined the Paris radio station Skyrock in 1998. There, he made sketches and further entertainment during the morning show.

The popularity and success of Michael Youn, at the most important French private broadcast station brought Youn to the attention of French TV executives. In July 2000, he was hired for the new morning show "Morning Live" shown on Métropole 6. With Vincent Desagnat and Benjamin Morgaine, Youn did the entertainment part of the show. Like their sketches and public events (e.g. foam bath in a Paris fountain, and waking random Parisians up shooting the slogan of the show at them), their parodies were particularly successful. In particular, they parodied the music scene of Jean-Michel Jarre, casting-popstars, the Grand Prix and French rappers.

The success of "Morning Live" was mainly due to Youn and his colleagues – when they left the show, it remained on the air for just one more year.

After leaving "Morning Live" in 2002, Youn, Desagnat and Morgaine have focused on their music parodies: The three sailors "Piotr", "Olaff" and "Dvorjak" from the Eastern European "Slowakistan", the Bratisla Boys, appeared on the Western music market with their song "Stach Stach". The act became a big success and was number one on the French charts for ten weeks. On a 2004 list of the all-time best selling CDs in France, "Stach Stach" was listed number 30. The success even spread beyond the French border and reached Switzerland, where it was 2nd on the official charts. On 7 July 2002, the project was stopped by its makers. They claimed that the Bratisla Boys had vanished on the Dead Sea without a trace.

In 2003, the film "La Beuze", written by Youn and Desagnat, was released. Youn played the character of Alphonse, the "unknown son" of James Brown, who tries to start his own career – by creating a new (fictional) style called "Frunkp" (a mixture of funk and rap). The song "Le Frunkp" was published as a CD-single and Michaël Youn (under the name of Alphonse Brown) had another hit. This time, he even reached #1 in Swiss charts.

Youn had a comedy-tour, called Pluskapoil in 2003/04 (its sequel followed in 2005) and has acted in films.
New music projects followed: Les Conards (The Imbeciles) with Comme des Connards, a cover version of  My Sharona by The Knack, as well as a song for the movie Iznogoud (both were in the French Top 20). He had small roles in rather big films, and was part of Les 11 commandements in 2004 (A French film done in the style of MTV's Jackass, together with Desagnat and Morgaine).

In 2005, Youn was Iznogoud in the film version of the comic "Iznogoud" (also known as Isnogud). In 2006, he had the main role in the film comedy Incontrôlable. Those two films were not very successful, critics and viewers finding them only so-so. Both films starred Desagnat and Morgaine, but only in small roles.

In 2010, he directed his first movie "Fatal" in which he also stars.

Fatal Bazooka 

Towards the end of 2006 they picked up a parody from their old Morning-Live times: the hardcore rappers Fatal Bazooka ("Lethal Bazooka"), in which they played two rappers called "Profanation Fonky" and "La Marmotte Infernale" who wore balaclavas. Using a hardcore style of rap, they rapped Fous ta cagoule ("Put on your balaclava"). It reached  #1 on the French charts.

The CD-single is "Fous ta cagoule" of 2006. The song parodies multiple French rappers, in particular slammer Grand Corps Malade and Booba. The video clip was made by Nicolas Benamou.

His first single of 2007, "Mauvaise foi nocturne"' with Pascal Obispo parodied Confessions nocturnes by Diam's and Vitaa (mentioned in "Parle à ma main" as well) also went to #1 in France.

Fatal Bazooka released a full LP titled T'as vu ? in the last week of May 2007 selling over 300,000 copies in France and scored another N1 single (Christmas 2007 number one) with "Parle à ma main" ("Talk to my hand") featuring Yelle released at the end of 2007. This time they attacked another phenomenon of French society : the "lolitas" and their antics.

The album was released through Jam Block entertainment/Warner Music France.

Discography 
(For discography as part of Fatal Bazooka, refer to their page)

Albums

Singles

Filmography

Television

References

External links 

 Official Homepage
 

1973 births
Living people
People from Suresnes
French male film actors
French-language singers
French comedians
20th-century French Jews
French parodists
French people of Algerian-Jewish descent
French people of Hungarian descent
French people of Italian descent
French people of Moroccan-Jewish descent
Cours Florent alumni
French LGBT rights activists
21st-century French male actors
21st-century French singers
21st-century French male singers